Anisolabis oahuensis is a species of earwig in the genus Anisolabis, the family Anisolabididae, the suborder Forficulina, and the order Dermaptera.

References 

Anisolabididae
Endemic fauna of Hawaii
Insects described in 1879